Marie Cremers (1874-1960) was a Dutch  painter, lithographer, graphic artist, and illustrator.

Biography
Cremers was born on 12 January 1874 in Amsterdam. Her instructors included August Allebé, Marie van Regteren Altena, Georgine Schwartze, and Jan Veth  She was a member of the Arti et Amicitiae. Cremers was active as an author and illustrator. Her work was included in the 1939 exhibition and sale Onze Kunst van Heden (Our Art of Today) at the Rijksmuseum in Amsterdam.

Cremers died on 9 March 1960 in Bussum.

References

External links
example of  Cremers' work on RKD

1874 births
1960 deaths
Artists from Amsterdam
19th-century Dutch women artists
20th-century Dutch women artists